Events from the year 1660 in Ireland.

Incumbent
Monarch: monarchy re-established, Charles II (starting 23 April)

Events
 April 23 – Charles II becomes King of England, Scotland and Ireland.
 June – George Monck, 1st Duke of Albemarle, one of the principal architects of Charles II's Restoration, is appointed Lord Lieutenant of Ireland, although represented by deputies.
 August 16 – an Indemnity and Oblivion Act is sent to Ireland by Sir Paul Davys, granting indemnities to those who had been active in the Interregnum.
 First synagogue in Ireland established in Dublin.

Births
April 16 – Hans Sloane, physician and collector (d.1753)

Date unknown
Hugh MacMahon, Roman Catholic Bishop of Clogher, later Archbishop of Armagh (d.1737)
Thomas Southerne, dramatist (d.1746)

Deaths

References

 
1660s in Ireland
Ireland
Years of the 17th century in Ireland